Alabel, officially the Municipality of Alabel (Cebuano: Lungsod sa Alabel; Filipino: Bayan ng Alabel; Maguindanao: Inged nu Alabil),  is a 1st class municipality and capital of the province of Sarangani, Philippines. According to the 2020 census, it has a population of 88,294 people.

History
In 1947, the families of Santiago Alaba and Tomas Beldad Sr. settled in Buayan. The place became a barrio of the municipality of Dadiangas (now General Santos) on September 17, 1956, through Hadji Abdawa Mohamad and Marcos Malinao and named Alabel in honor of two families.

Alabel became a municipality under Republic Act 6393 (formerly House Bill No. 3222 sponsored by Rep. James L. Chongbian) dated September 10, 1971, comprising eight barrios separated from the city: Alabel (now Poblacion), Alegria, Maribulan, Pag-asa, Kawas, Domolok, Bagacay and Tokawal. Barangays Spring, Baluntay, Datal Anggas, and Paraiso were created between 1986 and 1989, bringing the number to twelve.

Alaba Administration (1971-1986)

The first set of elected officials were; Lucio J. Alaba as Mayor, Jose Orlino, Jr. as Vice Mayor, and Councilors; Dionisio Lim, Gregorio Lumanta, Hermogenes Pecolados, Ignacio Solis, Alfredo Radaza, Honorio Navarro, Teodolito Jabilles, and Exequil Tecson.

Martial Law

The so-called battle of Ilaga, Muslim and Lumads happened in Alabel during Marcos Regime in 1974. Many Lumads and Muslim was killed and murdered by paramilitary groups called ilaga (Ilonggo term for rats).

Civilian fled and evacuated in Dadiangas (now General Santos) in order to survive from brutalities in Alabel while some transfer and went home to their place of origin in Visayan Islands.

Sibugan Administration (1986-1998)
In 1986 EDSA Revolution, Mayor Alaba was replaced by Hernando L. Sibugan, the appointed mayor of the Ministry of Local Government and was elected to the same office in 1988 and 1992. Finally, Alabel was chosen the capital town of the newly created Sarangani Province by virtue of Republic Act No. 7228 on March 16, 1992, through the representation of James L. Chiongbian.

President Corazon Aquino landed in Barangay Spring in 1988 during her visit in South Cotabato. The President together with her team visited Mindanao to watch the solar eclipse. Astronomers and other tourists watched the said celestial phenomena.

President Corazon Aquino and Defense Secretary Fidel Ramos were among the estimated 20,000 sight-seers and scientists who jammed the cities of Davao and General Santos for the event, seen as a total eclipse only in the nation's extreme southern tip and parts of Indonesia. It was the first total eclipse seen in the Philippines since 1955. Another is not expected until the year 2042.

The Grafilos
Two Grafilos became local chief executives of Alabel for a span of 18 year from 1998 to 2016.

Narsico Ra. Grafilo Jr., served as mayor of Alabel from 1998 to 2007. In his term, Kasadyaan Festival was inaugurated in 2001.

Corazon Sunga Grafilo succeeded Mayor Jun as mayor in 2007. In her term, Alabel became a sister city of Makati. Abante Alabel as a town's tagline was popularized in her term.

Creation of Ladol
Provincial Ordinance Nos. 2003-025 (dated December 1, 2003) and 2011-7-048 (July 26, 2011) of the Sarangani Provincial Board provided for the constitution of Sitio Ladol in Brgy. Poblacion into a regular barangay. This was ratified in a plebiscite held on August 18, 2012.

The separation was further formalized when Pres. Rodrigo Duterte signed Republic Act 11599 on December 10, 2021.

Salarda Administration (2016-present)
The administration of Vic Paul Salarda started in 2016. Infrastructure projects and community services were his administration's priority. Serbisyong Smile sa Barangay (SSB) was his flagship program where government agencies joined to bring services to various barangay in the municipality. Smile Alabel is the popular tagline of Mayor Nonoy.

Cityhood

House Bill No. 3494 was filed last August 6, 2019, for the conversion of the municipality of Alabel into a component city in the province of Sarangani. The bill is currently pending with the committee on local government since August 13, 2019.

Creation of New Canaan

On August 20, 2022, majority of selected residents of Alabel ratified in a plebiscite Provincial Ordinance No. 2009-6-044, dated June 29, 2009, separating a part of Barangay Pag-asa to create a new one to be called New Canaan.

Geography
Alabel is located at the head of Sarangani Bay in the southern part of Mindanao Island.

Barangays

Alabel is politically subdivided into 14 barangays.
 Alegria
 Bagacay
 Baluntay
 Datal Anggas
 Domolok
 Kawas
 Ladol
 Maribulan
 New Canaan 
 Pag-Asa
 Paraiso
 Poblacion
 Spring
 Tokawal

Climate

Demographics

Economy

Alabel is largely based on agriculture with a high level production of dried coconut meat. Animal husbandry is the second biggest income earner, notably cattle farming. Other agricultural products are coconuts, maize, sugarcane, bananas, pineapples, cotton, mangoes; goat farming, pork, eggs, beef; fish; charcoal; coconut weaving. It is adjacent to the highly urbanized sea port city of General Santos.

The economy has accelerated in the past decade driven by advances in global communication technology and the finishing of a modern highway that tremendously improved trade and transport.

Tourism

Alabel is known for its beaches and agricultural lands. 
 Ladol Beach
 Half Moon (known as Kawas) Beach

Culture
The Municipality of Alabel celebrates it Foundation anniversary every 10th day of September. It is an annual celebration to commemorate the founding of the town. Together the people of Alabel also celebrates the Kasadyaan Festival. Kasadyaan means bliss, to give an ideal representation of what is Alabel.

The annual Patronal Fiesta in Alabel is celebrated every May 15. It is feast day of San Isidro Labrador, the town's patron saint and the patron saint of farmers.

Mutya ng Alabel is the annual beauty and brains pageant held in Alabel.

Infrastructure
The construction of new municipal hall building was initialized in 2016. Municipal Civic Gymnasium facade was also renovated.

Transportation
It takes 30 minutes land travel by a PUV or tricycle from General Santos to Alabel. ALTRAMSCO is the accredited transport union in Alabel.

Various roads and bridges in different sites in the municipality helps to render efficient services to people especially in far flung locations. Farm to Market roads were essential in bring goods and crops to the town's center.

Health

Alabel Municipal Health Office was headed by Dr. Honorato Fabio. The Alabel Birthing Home was built to supplement the need of maternal health services.

The Rehabilitation Center in Kawas, Alabel, is a China-funded P350 million regional drug treatment and rehabilitation center. This facility will serve as rehabilitation center for drug dependents and users.

In 2016, Alabel received the DOH's prestigious award known as Red Orchid Award. The LGU-Alabel strict implementation of its No Smoking Policy bagged it Hall of Famer DOH's Red Orchid Award in 2018 DOH 12 Regional Awards.

Security
Peace and order in Alabel was maintain by Philippine National Police (PNP) and Armed Forces of the Philippines (AFP).

Education
The Division office of the Department of Education (DEPED) Sarangani Province is located in the Provincial Compound in Alabel.

Elementary
 Alabel Central Integrated SPED Center - located in Poblacion, Alabel

Secondary
Alabel National High School is considered the seat of excellence in secondary education in the entire Sarangani Province. Producing highly competitive and world-class citizenry. ANHS was one of the many Tech-Voc School in the Province. It was established in 1960's as community high school.

The current vice mayor of Alabel, Ronnel Saldua Espaňol, MPA is one of the alumni of ANHS in the year 1992.

Alabel National Science High School, the only regional science high school in Soccsksargen is located in Alabel. It was created through the initiative of the then Congressman James L. Chiongbian. It is the best performing school in Sarangani Province in the discipline of Math and Science. In fact, its students have already represented Alabel in the many international research competition abroad. .

Tertiary
 Primasia Foundation College Inc.

Government

List of Alabel Mayors

 Lucio Alaba (1971-1986)
 Hernando Sibugan (1986-1998)
 Narciso Ra. Grafilo Jr. (1998-2007)
 Corazon Sunga Grafilo (2007-2016)
 Vic Paul Molina Salarda, MPA (2016–present)

List of Alabel Vice Mayors
 Jose A. Orlino Jr. (1978-1986)
 Honorio Cayetuna Navarro (1986-1993)
 Narciso Ra. Grafilo Jr.(1993-1998)
 Armando Chavez Rabia (1998-2001)
 Virgilio Clark Tobias (Ret.) (2001-2004)
 Ptr. Hermie Galzote (2004-2007)
 Vic Paul Molina Salarda, MPA (2007-2016)
 Ronnel Saldua Español, MPA (2016–2022)
 Lente Lee Salway Jr. (2022–Present)

Sister cities
 Makati, Metro Manila

References

External links

Alabel Profile at PhilAtlas.com
Alabel Profile at the DTI Cities and Municipalities Competitive Index
Alabel Municipal Profile at the Province of Sarangani Official Website
[ Philippine Standard Geographic Code]
Philippine Census Information
Local Governance Performance Management System

Municipalities of Sarangani
Provincial capitals of the Philippines